Rosie Carpe is a 2001 novel by the French writer Marie NDiaye. It received the 2001 Prix Femina. It was originally published in France by Les Éditions de Minuit. The English translation by Tamsin Black was published in 2004 by the University of Nebraska Press.

Summary

The novel follows the titular character, Rosie Carpe, as she attempts to reconnect with her estranged brother in Guadeloupe.

References 

2001 French novels
Novels by Marie NDiaye
Les Éditions de Minuit books